The 2003–04 Liga Artzit season saw Ironi Nir Ramat HaSharon win the title and promotion to Liga Leumit alongside runners-up Hapoel Acre. Hapoel Tira and Hapoel Beit She'an were relegated to Liga Alef.

Beitar Avraham Be'er Sheva who had been relegated from Liga Leumit the previous season and were due to play in Liga Artzit in 2003–04, folded in the summer of 2003. Their place was taken by Hapoel Marmorek, the best runners-up in Liga Alef.

Final table

References
Israel Third Level 2003/04 RSSSF

Liga Artzit seasons
3
Israel